Secret Symphony is the fifth studio album by singer-songwriter Katie Melua, and was released on 5 March 2012. The album was recorded at Air Studios in London in collaboration with orchestrator and conductor Mike Batt.

Melua said in a statement: "This album was going to be my 'singer's album'. I had always wanted to do this one day; singing other people's songs brings something out of you and your voice that isn't perhaps where you would have gone vocally with your own material."

She added: "It stretches you. As it happened Mike and I did write a couple of new ones, but the general idea was to find songs by great writers such as Ron Sexsmith ('Gold In Them Hills') and a favourite song of mine, originally recorded by Bonnie Raitt ('Too Long At The Fair') plus some more well-known ones like Keeping The Dream Alive."

The lead single, "Better Than a Dream", and the track "Walls of the World" were both originally recorded by Melua's longtime collaborator Mike Batt, for the TV series The Dreamstone and his 1977 solo album Schizophonia respectively. "The Bit That I Don't Get" music video was filmed at several locations in Farnham, Surrey including the Lion and Lamb Yard, Guitar Village and 101 Collectors' Records. Farnham being the location for Mike Batt's studio where they made demo recordings.

The record serves as the follow-up to Melua's 2010 album The House, which reached number four on the UK album chart. Musicperk.com rated the album 9/10.

A "Special Bonus Edition" of the album has also been released. It consists of the album, four extra tracks dubbed "The Secret Sessions" and a second CD containing a live album: "Live In Berlin".

In 2012 it was awarded a diamond certification from the Independent Music Companies Association which indicated sales of at least 200,000 copies throughout Europe.

Track listing

Chart performance
In the United Kingdom, the album debuted at #8 with 19,071 copies sold in its first week.

Weekly charts

Year-end charts

Certifications

References

2012 albums
Katie Melua albums
Albums produced by Mike Batt